Ahmed Eid (born 1 January 2001) is an Egyptian professional footballer who plays as a Right Back  for Egyptian Premier League club Zamalek.

Honours

Zamalek
Egyptian Super Cup: 2019–20
 CAF Super Cup: 2020

External links
Official website
Zamalek TV channel on YouTube
Zamalek SC on FIFA.com
Zamalek SC on CAF
Zamalek SC on Egyptian Football Association
 
 
 

Egyptian footballers
Living people
2001 births
Zamalek SC players
Association football fullbacks